Bematistes formosa is a butterfly in the family Nymphalidae. It is found from Cameroon to the Democratic Republic of the Congo and in western Uganda.

Description

P. formosa Btlr. (59 b) is a little known species very similar to the following [ Bematistes  poggei ]; it differs from it in having the transverse band of the forewing narrowed towards the costal margin and with the distal side angled at vein 4, while the white median band of the hindwing is narrower; transverse band of the forewing orange- yellow in the male white in the female. Cameroon to the Congo.

References

External links
Die Gross-Schmetterlinge der Erde 13: Die Afrikanischen Tagfalter. Plate XIII 59 b
Images representing Acraea formosa at Bold

Butterflies described in 1874
Acraeini
Butterflies of Africa
Taxa named by Arthur Gardiner Butler